The 1993 Torneo Godó was the forty-first edition of the Torneo Godó and it took place from April 5–12, 1993.

Seeds

Draw

Key
WC - Wildcard
Q - Qualifier
r - Retired

Finals

Earlier rounds

Section 1

Section 2

Section 3

Section 4

Singles